Bab Al-Moatham (Bab Al-Muadham or Bab Al-Mu'azzam) is a neighborhood of the Rusafa district of Baghdad, Iraq, not far east of the Tigris River. It is the location of the Iraq National Library and Archive, a campus of the University of Baghdad, Baghdad Medical City, and the former Garden of Ridván.

Bab